The 1937–38 season was the forty-third season in which Dundee competed at a Scottish national level, playing in Division One under new manager Andy Cunningham. Despite a very strong start to the season and a record 6–1 win over Rangers, Dundee would finish in 19th place after a draw against relegation rivals Ayr United and Queen of the South defeating Rangers on the final day, and would be relegated by a single point from the Scottish Division One for the first time in their history despite having "the richest directorate in Scotland at the time." Dundee would also compete in the Scottish Cup, where they were knocked out in the 1st round by Albion Rovers.

Scottish Division One 

Statistics provided by Dee Archive.

League table

Scottish Cup 

Statistics provided by Dee Archive.

Player Statistics 
Statistics provided by Dee Archive

|}

See also 

 List of Dundee F.C. seasons

References

External links 

 1937-38 Dundee season on Fitbastats

Dundee F.C. seasons
Dundee